The following persons have been provost of Trinity College Dublin.

References

Trinity College, Dublin
 
Trinity College, Dublin, Provosts